The 2013 Chicago Red Stars season is the fifth season of the soccer club and its first season in National Women's Soccer League.

Major events
In November 2012, it was announced that there would be eight teams in a new women's professional soccer league, the National Women's Soccer League will be subsidized by the USSF, the Canadian Soccer Association (CSA) and the Mexican Football Federation (FMF). The three federations would pay the salaries of their national team players (24 from the US, 16 from Canada, and 12 from Mexico) to aid the teams in creating world-class rosters while staying under the salary cap.  The players would be distributed evenly (as possible) among the eight teams in an allocation process.  USSF would run the league offices and set the schedule.

Current squad

First-team squad

Squad correct as of July 2, 2013

Second-team squad/Injured

Player movement

In 
Per NWSL and club policies terms of the deals do not get disclosed.

Out 

Players not selected in either the 2013 NWSL Supplemental Draft or signed as a free agent, but were on the 2012 Red Star squad: defender Elise Weber, defender Lauren Alkek, midfielder Jennifer Buczkowski, forward Amanda Cinalli, goalkeeper Kelsey Devonshire, midfielder Vanessa DiBernardo, forward Allison Doyle, goalkeeper Kristin Eggert, midfielder Ashleigh Ellenwood, defender Ashlee Elliott, goalkeeper Jamie Forbes, defender Alexandra Heller, defender Brittany Hengesh, midfielder Kelsey Hough, forward Michele Weissenhofer, defender Kara Kabellis, midfielder Vanessa Laxgang, midfielder Nicole Lipp, defender Mary Therese McDonnell, defender Kecia Morway, midfielder Shayla Mutz, forward Lindsey Schwartz, defender Sammy Scofield.
 Invitees to the preseason camp who departed or were released in the preseason: midfielder Natalia Daniels, goalkeeper Erin Kane, midfielder Maureen Smunt, midfielder Alissa VonderHaar.

Management and staff 
Front Office
Coaching Staff
Manager Rory Dames
First Assistant Coach Stephanie Foster
Second Assistant Coach Christian Lavers
Goalkeeper Coach Trae Manny

Regular-season standings

Results summary

Match results

Preseason

National Women's Soccer League

Squad statistics

Top scorers
Includes all competitive matches. The list is sorted by shirt number when total goals are equal.

Updated to matches played on 18 August 2013
Source: Chicagoredstars.com Player Stats

Top assists
Includes all competitive matches. The list is sorted by shirt number when total assists are equal.

|}

Awards

NWSL Player of the Week

NWSL Best XI

Notes

References 

2013
Chicago Red Stars
Chicago Red Stars
Chicago Red Stars